The 2004 Asian Junior Athletics Championships was the eleventh edition of the international athletics competition for Asian under-20 athletes, organised by the Asian Athletics Association. It took place from 12–15 June at the Perak Stadium in Ipoh, Malaysia. A total of 43 events were contested, which were divided equally between male and female athletes aside from the men's 3000 metres steeplechase.

Medal summary

Men

Women

2004 Medal Table

References

Results
Asian Junior Championships 2004. World Junior Athletics History. Retrieved on 2013-10-16.

External links
Asian Athletics official website

Asian Junior Championships
Asian Junior Athletics Championships
Ipoh
Asian Junior Athletics Championships
2004 in Asian sport
International athletics competitions hosted by Malaysia
2004 in youth sport